Exelastis dowi is a species of moth in the genus Exelastis, known from the Bahamas, Belize and Florida in the United States.

Adults are on wing in March in Florida and in April in the Bahamas and Belize, and have a forewing length of 6–9.5 millimetres. The forewings are light buff to light ochraceous-buff mixed with light tan scales and the hindwings are slightly darker than the forewing and uniformly ochraceous-tawny with medium gray fringes.

Etymology
The species is named in honor of Mr. Linwood C. Dow who collected the holotype and paratypes from Key Largo, Florida and Belize.

References

Exelastini
Moths described in 2008